Alexis Diaz (born 7 May 1987) is a Venezuelan minimumweight boxer.  Diaz defeated Jorle Estrada for the WBA Fedelatin minimumweight title.  Diaz is the #4 ranked minimumweight according to the WBA and #10 according to the WBO.

References

External links

1987 births
Living people
Mini-flyweight boxers
Venezuelan male boxers